Mi-yeon, also spelled Mi-youn or Mi-yeun, is a Korean feminine given name. The meaning differs based on the hanja used to write each syllable of the name.

Hanja
, regulations of the Supreme Court of Korea permit the following 44 hanja with the reading  and 34 hanja with the reading  to be registered for use in given names.

 : 
 : 

Ways of writing this name in hanja include:

 : "beautiful and kind-hearted"
 : "overflowing with beauty"

People
People with this name include:
Serra Miyeun Hwang (born 1962), South Korean-born American composer
Lee Mi-yeon (born 1971), South Korean actress
Kim Mi-yeon (born 1979), South Korean curler
Kan Mi-youn (born 1982), South Korean singer, member of girl group Baby Vox
Cho Mi-yeon (born 1997), South Korean singer, member of girl group (G)I-dle

See also
List of Korean given names

References

Korean feminine given names